The Saratoga Automobile Museum is located in the  Saratoga Spa State Park in Saratoga Springs, New York.  Housed in a former water bottling plant built in 1935, the museum is chartered by the Board of Regents of the State of New York Department of Education as a 501(c) 3 not-for-profit institution and focuses on the impact of the automobile in the past, present and future in New York and the wider world. The Museum is also a member of the American Alliance of Museums (AAM).

It can display approximately thirty vehicles between three galleries on two floors. The ground floor displays rotating featured exhibits between two galleries. Gallery A is an expansive space featuring 30+ foot ceilings, original tile walls and flooring, and the focal point of the gallery, 3 floor-to-ceiling palladian windows and observation walkway. This gallery is often used for public and private events and weddings. Also on the first floor is a small theater room and an art gallery showcasing local and international artists and photographers. The second floor houses the two permanent exhibits overlooking the first floor, Racing in New York and East of Detroit, plus the New York State Stock Car Association Hall of Fame.

References

External links

Automobile museums in New York (state)
Buildings and structures in Saratoga Springs, New York
Museums in Saratoga County, New York
Tourist attractions in Saratoga Springs, New York